Aberdeen F.C. competed in the Northern League and Scottish Cup in the 1903–04 season.

Overview

It was Aberdeen's first season in Scottish football, the club having been established in April 1903 following a merger of three local clubs, Orion, Victoria United and the original Aberdeen F.C. The new club failed to gain election to Division One of the Scottish Football League and did not apply to join Division Two. They were placed in the Northern League along with eleven other clubs from the north of Scotland. The club finished third in the league, but lost their first Scottish Cup tie to Alloa Athletic.

Results

Northern League

Final league table

Scottish Cup

Squad

Appearances and goals

|}

References

 

Aberdeen F.C. seasons
Aberdeen